Sina is a class of upgraded  developed by Iran.

History 
One of major naval production projects in Iran, it delivered Iran's first ever domestically-built warship in 2003. Abhijit Singh, a senior fellow at Observer Research Foundation described the project as "a proud testimony of Iran’s abilities at reverse engineering". According to Anthony Cordesman, Sina class ships have been "heavily updated" in comparison to the French-made . As of 2012, reportedly 10 ships were planned in this class.

Armament 
Ships of this class are equipped with four box launchers with C-802 or Noor, as well as one 76mm main gun.

Ships in the class 
As of 2015, four ships (Sina 5 to 8) were under construction, two of them in the Caspian Sea and the other two at Bandar Abbas. In 2020, Farzin Nadimi of The Washington Institute wrote that production of these ships has not improved as expected.

See also

 List of naval ship classes of Iran
 List of military equipment manufactured in Iran

References 

Missile boat classes
Ship classes of the Islamic Republic of Iran Navy
Ships built at Shahid Tamjidi shipyard
Ships built at Iranian Naval Factories